Teodoro Manguiat Kalaw (March 31, 1884 – December 4, 1940) was a Filipino scholar, legislator, and historian.

Early life  
He was born in Lipa, Batangas on March 31, 1884. He was the third of four children of police chief Valerio Kalaw and Maria Manguiat. His siblings were scholar and political scientist Maximo, and two sisters, Rosario and Manuela.

He finished his secondary studies at Instituto Rizal in Lipa, Batangas, and finished his bachelor's degree in arts with honors at Liceo de Manila. He took up his law degree at Escuela de Derecho, where he was mentored by Rafael Palma and Juan Sumulong. In 1905, he topped the bar examinations, having obtained  "grade of 100 percent in civil law and three other subjects".

He served as secretary of then Philippine Assembly Majority Floor Leader Manuel L. Quezon until 1908.

Journalism 
While pursuing law, Kalaw became a writer for El Renacimiento, along with Rafael Palma and Fernando Ma. Guerrero. In October 1908, Interior Secretary Dean C. Worcester filed a libel suit against the paper for their editorial entitled, "Aves de Rapiña" ("Birds of Prey").

The case led to the closure of the paper. In January 1910, the court meted out prison sentences against Kalaw and publisher Martin Ocampo. Both Kalaw and Ocampo were pardoned by Governor General Francis B. Harrison in 1914.

Political career 
In 1909, Kalaw was elected the youngest member of the Philippine Assembly at age 25, representing Batangas's 3rd district. During his term, he sponsored bills supporting internal migration and agricultural development and maintenance of public schools through municipal taxation.

At the end of his term in 1913, he was appointed secretary to the Philippine Assembly. In 1916, he was appointed the first director of the National Library, earning him the moniker "Father of the Philippine Library System". He would serve as its director once more from 1929 to 1939.

In 1920, he was appointed Interior Secretary. His term as secretary was cut short on December 21, 1922, when Senate President Manuel L. Quezon appointed him as executive secretary and chief adviser of the Commission on Independence.

Memberships 
He became a Mason in 1907, then later became grand master at age 31 in 1928. On June 15, 1932, he was made a 33° Mason in the Scottish Rite of Masonry. He became Grand Master of the Grand Lodge of the Philippines from 1928 to 1929.

Kalaw was a member of the Academy of Political Science, American Social and Political Science; Sociedad Americana de Derecho Internacional; Real Academia Hispano Americano de Ciencias y Artes, of whose Philippine Section he became president in 1925; Associacion Hispano-Filipina, and the Philippine Library Association.

He was conferred an honorary fellowship to the Upsilon Sigma Phi fraternity.

Death 
He died on December 4, 1940, aged 56, at the Philippine General Hospital.

Personal life 

Kalaw and his wife, Pura, had three children. Their son, Teodoro Kalaw Jr., became a prominent businessman and was married to Philippine senator Eva Estrada. Their daughter, Maria, was a Philippine Senator from 1961 to 1967. Another daughter, Purita, was an art critic.

Works and writings 

 La Campaña de Kuomintang 
 Reformas en La Enseñanza del Derecho 
 La Constitucion de Malolos (1910), a critical analysis of the Malolos Constitution
 Teorias Constitucionales (1912), theories and analysis of nationhood, government, and constitution
 The Constitutional Plan of the Philippine Revolution (1914)
 La Revolucion Filipina (1914)
 Manual de Ciencia Politica (1918)
 Ang Pinagtatalunang Akta ng Katipunan (1930)
 Las Cartas Politicas de Apolinario Mabini (1930)
 Epistolario Rizalino (1930-1937)
 Gregorio H. Del Pilar: Heroe de Tirad (1930), biography of Gregorio H. Del Pilar
 Aide-de-Camp to Freedom (1940)

References

External links 
 National Historical Institute

1884 births
1940 deaths
Colegio de San Juan de Letran alumni
People from Lipa, Batangas
Writers from Batangas
20th-century Filipino historians
20th-century Filipino lawyers
Members of the House of Representatives of the Philippines from Batangas
Secretaries of the Interior and Local Government of the Philippines
Spanish-language writers of the Philippines
Members of the Philippine Legislature